Santa Cruz Atizapán is a town and municipality, in Mexico State in Mexico. The municipality covers an area of  8.42 km².

As of 2005, the municipality had a total population of 8,909.

References

Municipalities of the State of Mexico
Populated places in the State of Mexico